Helena Ritz Fathia Nkrumah (22 February 1932 – 31 May 2007), born Fathia Halim Rizk, was a Coptic Egyptian and the First Lady of the newly independent Ghana as the wife of Kwame Nkrumah, its first president.

Fathia Nkrumah was born to a Coptic Christian family and brought up in Zeitoun, a district of Cairo. She was the first child of a civil servant who died early; Fathia was raised by her mother single-handedly after her husband's death.

Early life and career
She was born Fathia Halim Rizk in Zeitoun, Cairo, in 1932. Her father worked as a clerk in an Egyptian telephone company and died early, leaving her mother widowed and having to raise Fathia single-handed. She was the eldest of five children in the family.

After completing her secondary education, where she studied French, she worked as a teacher at her school in Zeitoun, Notre Dame des Apôtres. As teaching did not appeal to her, she took a job in a bank.

Marriage 
Frederick, an American journalist, who published her book in 1967, said Nkrumah sent his friend, Alhaji Saleh Said Sinare, who was one of the first Ghanaian Muslims to study in Egypt, to find him a Christian wife from Egypt, and Fathia was one of the final five women chosen. At that stage, Kwame Nkrumah proposed to marry her. Her mother was reluctant to see another of her children marry a foreigner and quit the country, as Fathia's brother had left Egypt with his English wife.

Fathia explained that Nkrumah was an anti-colonial hero, like Nasser, yet her mother refused to speak to her or bless the marriage. Nkrumah married Fathia at Christianborg Castle, Accra on the evening of the 1957 New Year's Eve upon her arrival in Ghana.

Leaving Ghana and later life

Fathia Nkrumah was the mother of three young children when her husband was overthrown in Ghana's first successful military coup d'état on 24 February 1966. She had to take her children to Cairo, to be raised there while her husband went into exile in Guinea.

Her children have all gone on to have careers relating to politics. Her daughter, Samia Nkrumah, was the chairperson of the Convention People's Party (CPP), the Ghanaian political party that her father founded, from 2011 to 2015.

Death
Fathia died on 31 May 2007 at Badrawy Hospital in Cairo due to a stroke after a period of illness.

Her memorial mass was held in the Coptic Orthodox Cathedral Church in Cairo by Pope Shenouda III on 1 June 2007. Subsequently, Fathia Nkrumah's bodily remains were flown to Ghana for a funeral at the State House and, following her "lifelong request", was buried next to her husband at the Kwame Nkrumah Memorial Park.

See also
Ghana
Kwame Nkrumah
Samia Nkrumah
List of Copts

References

External links
Profile by Gamal Nkrumah (September 2000)
Fathia fata Nkrumah kente design 
Picture: Fathia with Kwame Nkrumah and W.E.B. DuBois
Pictures from Fathia's funeral

1932 births
2007 deaths
Burials in Ghana
Egyptian people of Coptic descent
Fathia Nkrumah
Egyptian emigrants to Ghana
First ladies of Ghana
Kwame Nkrumah